Oakport may refer to a community in the United States:

 Oakport, Minnesota
 Oakport Township, Clay County, Minnesota